Gaoliu may refer to:

 Gaoliu (高柳), a former name of Yanggao, Shanxi, China
 Gaoliu County, a former name of Yanggao County
 Gaoliu, Feixi County (高刘镇), town in Anhui, China
 Gaoliu, Qingzhou (高柳镇), town in Qingzhou, Shandong, China